"Younger Us" is the second 7" single by Canadian rock duo Japandroids. It was released by Polyvinyl Record Co. on July 20, 2010. The initial pressing was limited to 2500 copies on clear vinyl. The song has been later included on Japandroids' second album Celebration Rock.

Pitchfork Media awarded the song "Younger Us" a 'Best New Music' designation, and ranked it #42 on its list of top 100 singles of 2010.

Track listing

 "Younger Us" - 3:35
 "Sex and Dying in High Society" (X cover) - 2:38

References 

2010 singles
Japandroids songs
2010 songs
Polyvinyl Record Co. singles